Tudeh Bin (also Romanized as Tūdeh Bīn and Toodeh Bin; also known as Ārpāshāl and Tūdabīn) is a village in Darsajin Rural District, in the Central District of Abhar County, Zanjan Province, Iran. At the 2006 census, its population was 335, in 94 families.

References 

Populated places in Abhar County